The Community of Democratic Choice is an intergovernmental organization established on 2 December 2005, by nine states of Northern, Central and Eastern Europe in Kyiv, Ukraine. It was mainly signed by countries from the region between the Baltic, Black Sea and Caspian Sea ("The three Seas"). Its main task is to promote democracy, human rights, and the rule of law throughout the region.

Membership 
Founding member states:

Observer countries/organizations:

 Organization for Security and Co-operation in Europe (OSCE)

History 

The creation of the Community of Democratic Choice was foreshadowed by the Borjomi Declaration of August 2005, a joint statement signed by the Presidents of Georgia and Ukraine, Mikheil Saakashvili and Viktor Yushchenko, which envisioned the Community as a "powerful instrument for removing the remaining divisions in the region, tackling human rights violations, and any type of confrontation, or frozen conflicts".

The Community of Democratic Choice was subsequently established in Kyiv during a two-day forum aimed at promoting democracy and human rights in the wider region of the Baltic-Black-Caspian Seas. Besides the presidents of the nine founding states, there were delegations from Armenia, Azerbaijan, Bulgaria, the Czech Republic, Hungary and Poland and also observers from the United States, the European Union and the Organization for Security and Cooperation in Europe.

Purpose 
The Ukrainian Foreign Minister Borys Tarasyuk, said that the community is not a project against anybody, but rather a project in favor of democracy, stability and prosperity. Likewise, President Viktor Yushchenko said that the initiative was not directed against any third countries or institutions and that its purpose was not "to befriend anyone against someone else", but that it must rather be seen as "dialogue between friends, adherents of ideas for promoting democracy and the supremacy of law".

On the other hand, Giorgi Arveladze, presidential administration head of Georgia, said that the community would in essence be "an axis of democratic countries that do not wish to remain in Russia's orbit".

Temuri Yakobashvili, the vice-president of the Georgian Foundation for Strategic and International Studies said that he saw the Community of Democratic Choice as something in between the two main "poles of attraction" in the region (the EU and the Shanghai Cooperation Organisation), saying that "the idea of creating a Community of Democratic Choice may appeal to those countries that are caught between those two blocs, but lean toward democracy and the West."

Besides the question of its character, the membership of the community is still not clear. At the Vilnius Conference in 2006, the two founding members Macedonia and Slovenia did not take part with representatives but one of the hosts was Poland. Further the Prime Minister of Sweden, Göran Persson stated his country's intention to join the organization that was welcomed by Saakashvilli, saying that Sweden's entry would provide additional impetus to the CDC forum. So up till now there the question of membership in the CDC is not answered.

Nevertheless, the President of Moldova, Vladimir Voronin, urged the Community to develop its own institutions, including its own parliamentary assembly, saying that it offered a possibility to integrate those countries that have chosen a European orientation.
The Vilnius Conference already gave a hint to what that means by including an Intellectuals, an NGO and a Youth Forum.

Meetings 
 December 1–2, 2005: Kyiv, Ukraine
 March 9–10, 2006: Tbilisi, Georgia
 May, 2006: Vilnius, Lithuania

See also 

Black Sea Forum for Partnership and Dialogue
Community for Democracy and Rights of Nations
Community of Democracies
Community of Democratic Choice Youth Forum
Eastern Partnership
Euronest Parliamentary Assembly
European Integration
Eurasian Economic Union
Eurosphere
Eurovoc
GUAM Organization for Democracy and Economic Development
Organization of the Black Sea Economic Cooperation
Politics of Europe

References 

 
Post-Soviet alliances
2005 establishments in Europe
Organizations established in 2005
International organizations based in Europe
European integration